Laetitia Heloise Arries is a South African politician who has served as a Member of the National Assembly since May 2019. Prior to her election to parliament, she served as a councillor of the George Local Municipality. Arries is a member of the Economic Freedom Fighters.

Career
Arries is a member of the Economic Freedom Fighters. She was elected as a PR councillor of the George Local Municipality in August 2016.

Arries was elected to the National Assembly at the general election held on 8 May 2019. On 22 May 2019, she was sworn in as an MP. Arries is one of two EFF MPs from George. The other EFF parliamentarian is Natasha Ntlangwini.

Arries served as an Alternate Member of the Portfolio Committee on Human Settlements, Water and Sanitation between 27 June 2019 and 6 May 2020. On 6 May 2020, she became an Alternate Member of the Portfolio Committee on Social Development.

References

External links

Living people
Year of birth missing (living people)
Economic Freedom Fighters politicians
Members of the National Assembly of South Africa
21st-century South African politicians
21st-century South African women politicians